Petit Bam-Bam Airport  is an airstrip serving Petit Bam-Bam, an exposed geologic formation of white clay overlain with red clay on the border between Estuaire and Moyen-Ogooué Provinces in Gabon.

See also

 List of airports in Gabon
 Transport in Gabon

References

External links
OpenStreetMap - Petit Bambam
 Google Earth

Airports in Gabon